Manuel Gutierrez Jr. (born April 4, 1991), known professionally as Manny MUA, is a make-up artist, YouTuber, entrepreneur, and beauty blogger. He is the first male brand ambassador for the make-up brand Maybelline. He is the founder and owner of the cosmetics brand Lunar Beauty, and has a social media presence that includes 4.8 million subscribers on YouTube and over 4.1 million followers on Instagram.

Career
Gutierrez told Teen Vogue that he first became interested in make-up after watching his mother do her make-up during his childhood. He later worked at Sephora and MAC. He began his YouTube channel in 2014. He regularly posts make-up tutorials, make-up first impressions, and beauty tips. He has collaborated with Makeup Geek on an eye-shadow palette, Morphe Cosmetics on an eye-shadow palette, OFRA Cosmetics on lip products, and Jeffree Star Cosmetics on two highlighters and 2 lipsticks.

In 2017, Gutierrez and fellow YouTuber Shayla Mitchell were announced as brand ambassadors for Maybelline, specifically Colossal Big Shot Mascara. He is the first male brand ambassador for the brand. He is the second male to be chosen as a spokesperson for a beauty brand after James Charles who had been previously announced as a spokesperson for CoverGirl in October 2016. Later that year, Gutierrez and Jeffree Star announced a collaboration for Star's make-up brand to debut in April. After the announcement, Black Moon Cosmetics sued the duo for copyright and trademark infringement alleging that they had copied their logo without permission. The lawsuit was later resolved. In April 2017, Gutierrez was the only male to make People magazine's annual "Most Beautiful" list. In 2018, he was named to Forbes annual list of "30 under 30" in the Arts and Style category. In 2018, Manny appeared in season three of Escape the Night as the Record Producer.

In 2018, Gutierrez started his makeup line called Lunar Beauty and launched the brand's first eye shadow palette, Life's a Drag. The palette includes 14 shades of bright and neutral eye shadow colors.

In 2021, Gutierrez asked Joe Biden and Anthony Fauci some questions during a virtual presidential town hall about vaccine hesitancy.

Filmography

Television

Personal life
Gutierrez grew up in a Mormon family and has two younger brothers. He is Mexican-American.
Before deciding on a career in beauty, Gutierrez planned to attend medical school with aspirations of becoming a plastic surgeon. He has a Bachelor's degree from San Diego State University.

References

External links

1991 births
Living people
American make-up artists
American YouTubers
Gay entertainers
American LGBT entertainers
LGBT YouTubers
LGBT people from California
LGBT Latter Day Saints
People with vitiligo
Beauty and makeup YouTubers
San Diego State University alumni
Artists from San Diego
Artists from Los Angeles
20th-century LGBT people
21st-century LGBT people